Bertrand Lacaste (born 26 June 1897 in Accous – 20 April 1994) was a French clergyman and bishop for the Roman Catholic Diocese of Oran. He became ordained in 1923. He was appointed bishop in 1945. He died on 20 April 1994, at the age of 96.

References

1897 births
1994 deaths
Roman Catholic bishops of Oran
20th-century Roman Catholic bishops in Algeria
People from Béarn
French Roman Catholic bishops in Africa
People of French Algeria